Jan Jambon (born 26 April 1960 in Genk) is a Belgian politician of the New Flemish Alliance (N-VA) who has been serving as Minister-President of Flanders since 2019. He replaced Kris Peeters as a member of the Belgian Chamber of Representatives in 2007. The N-VA was, at that time, partnered with the Christian-Democratic and Flemish party. In June 2010 and May 2014 he was re-elected on an N-VA list.

He became mayor of Brasschaat in 2013 after his party won the local elections in 2012. In November 2014, he was replaced as acting mayor by Koen Verberck (also N-VA), after joining the new Federal Government.

In October 2014 he became Deputy Prime Minister and Minister of the Interior and Security, charged with the direction of public buildings, in the Michel Government. Jambon remained in this position until the government fell in December 2018.

In 2019, he becomes the new Flemish minister-president of the Jambon government. He is also the mayor of the municipality of Brasschaat.

Engagement in the Flemish Movement 
Jan Jambon began his political career with the Volksunie Youth (VUJO) in Limburg and the Volksunie. From 1985 to 1988 he was a member of the main board of the national Volksunie Youth and chief editor of the monthly magazine WIJ-Jongeren. He belonged to the "right wing" in the party. Their position on the placement of nuclear weapons was diametrically opposed to the official VU party position. Jambon left that party behind in 1988, when nothing came of the so-called Third Phase of state reform. The broadening operation led by Hugo Schiltz and Jaak Gabriëls also proved difficult for him to digest, as did the election of the 'left-wing' member of parliament Herman Lauwers, national chairman of the VVKSM Scouts from Brasschaat. As a result He left this party in 1988 after the broadening operation wanted by Hugo Schiltz and Jaak Gabriëls, and moved with Peter De Roover to the Vlaamse Volksbeweging (VVB).

In the mid-1990s, Jambon tried together with Peter De Roover to influence the political character of the annual IJzerbedevaart in Diksmuide. He founded, among others with Lieven Van Gerven, then chairman of the Davidsfonds, the IJzerbedevaart  Forum. This forum died a quiet death in 1996 after the much more radical Werkgroep Radicalisering IJzerbedevaart, consisting of Voorpost, VNJ, NSV and others, then started the current IJzerwake in Steenstrate and Ypres.  

In 1992, he co-authored the book Vlaanderen staat in Europa with Peter de Roover and became a member of the pro-independence think tank In de Warande.

From 1992 he was for many years chairman of the Overlegcentrum van Vlaamse Verenigingen and also a national board member of the Vlaamse Volksbeweging, where he was elected treasurer in October 1998 and subsequently became political and administrative secretary. Since 1991 he has been a board member of the Algemeen Nederlands Zangverbond (General Dutch Singing Association). 

For several years he was chairman of the Overlegcentrum van Vlaamse Verenigingen (think tank of Flemish associations) and a member of the leadership of the Vlaamse Volksbeweging (Flemish People's Movement), a separatist movement demanding Flemish independence, of which he was elected treasurer in October 1998 before becoming administrative and political secretary.

Political career 
On 18 February 2006 Jambon resigned from the Vlaamse Volksbeweging to work for the New Flemish Alliance (N-VA) in order to preparte the separtition of Belgium.

On 8 December 2005 Jambon founded a branch of the N-VA in the Antwerp town of Brasschaat. At the municipal elections on 8 October 2006, Jambon received 565 preferential votes and from January 2007 he was alderman for finance and local economy. In mid-March 2007, he stood as a candidate in Antwerp on the list of N-VA and CD&V for the federal parliamentary elections, where he obtained 9,099 preferential votes.

On 28 June 2007 he became a member of parliament in the Belgian Chamber of Representatives, succeeding Kris Peeters on the CD&V/N-VA cartel list. After the vote on the split of the electoral district of Brussels-Halle-Vilvoorde on 7 November 2007 Jambon declared that the N-VA would not step into an orange-blue emergency cabinet if there was no prospect of state reform. In the elections of 13 June 2010 and of 25 May 2014, he was re-elected respectively as list leader and list duper of the Antwerp N-VA Chamber list. In the Chamber, he was N-VA group leader from 2008 to 2014.

Within the walls of the parliament, Jambon founded a "Diamond Club". Jan Jambon became chairman, Willem-Frederik Schiltz from Open Vld and Servais Verherstraeten from CD&V became vice-chairmen. Their intention was to represent the interests of the diamond sector at parliamentary level. It was remarkable that people's representatives so openly called for the interests of one business sector to be defended in an 'informal club'.In the 2012 provincial council elections, Jambon was the last one on the list in the canton of Antwerp in the municipality of Brasschaat, where the N-VA obtained 39 percent of the votes. He then became mayor of the municipality on 1 January 2013. In the municipal elections of 2018, N-VA obtained an absolute majority in the municipal council of Brasschaat with 44 percent, allowing him to remain mayor.

In 2014, he was included in the Michel I government, where he became Deputy Prime Minister and Minister of Security and the Interior. Koen Verberck became serving mayor of Brasschaat, Jambon however remained titular mayor. 

After the attacks in Brussels on 22 March 2016, Jambon and Minister of Justice Koen Geens offered their resignations, but this was refused by Prime Minister Charles Michel.

With the governmental crisis surrounding the UN migration treaty, the Michel I government fell and Jambon's ministerial mandate came to an end on 9 December 2018. He then became a member of parliament again and resumed his role as mayor from 2019, which was the first time that he had been elected to the post of mayor.

In the 2019 federal elections, he was N-VA list leader in the constituency of Antwerp. He was re-elected to the Chamber with 187,826 preferential votes and was active there until early October 2019. On 12 August 2019, it was announced that he would lead the negotiations for the formation of a new Flemish Government. Jambon thereby took the place of his party leader Bart De Wever, who was a candidate for prime minister during the election campaign. The Jambon government was finally formed in early October with Jambon as prime minister. He also became responsible for Culture, Foreign Policy and Development Cooperation.

Controversies 
After the 22 March 2016 attacks, Jambon, as Minister of the Interior, claimed in an interview with De Standaard that "a significant part of the Muslim community danced in response to the attacks." For this, he could not provide concrete indications of partying Muslims, but referred to information from the National Security Council showing that the incidents that occurred were marginal and did not involve a significant part of the Muslim community.

Case-Chovanec 
In August 2020, Jambon came under scrutiny for allegedly failing to act as interior minister in 2018 following an incident or Charleroi airport. In that incident, a Slovakian man, Jozef Chovanec, was killed in a police cell after an intervention by the aviation police (part of the federal police). Two and a half years after the incident, surveillance footage of the police action surfaced, causing a social outcry. In a meeting with the Parliamentary Committees on Justice and Home Affairs, Interior Minister Pieter De Crem indicated that Jambon was aware of the incident at the time, which he would have previously denied. Jambon claimed after De Crem's revelation that he had no recollection of it and that the file shows that neither he nor his cabinet had found out that the police had acted in a problematic manner.

Birthday of Sint-Maartensfonds
Representing the Flemish People's Movement, Jambon spoke on 5 May 2001 at the 50th Anniversary Celebration of the Flemish Eastern Front Community Sint-Maartensfonds v.z.w., a former organization of Flemish former volunteers of the Flemish Legion and the Waffen-SS. Jan Jambon was later criticized for making a speech.

This was brought out for the first time in 2007 by Karel De Gucht on VRT, in an election debate with Yves Leterme, who was then working with CD&V and N-VA. The fact was brought out a second time on 23 October 2013 by the far-right New-Solidarist Alternative, but this time with photo material. The VRT program Terzake devoted extra attention to the case on 24 October 2013 and the news was taken up by the main Flemish media, in De Tijd and De Standaard Avond, the online evening edition of De Standaard, which devoted its front page to it on 25 October 2013. Then-Flemish minister Johan Sauwens had to resign in May 2001 after it was revealed that he had participated in the same meeting. 

In 2014, three days after his appointment as federal minister, he gave an interview to the French-language newspapers La Libre Belgique and La Dernière Heure, where he sought to justify his presence at the anniversary of the Sint-Maartensfonds. During the interview he called the collaboration a mistake, saying the following: "It's easy to talk in retrospect. The people who collaborated with the Germans had their reasons. I did not live in that period." This statement was criticized by several Belgian politicians, as well as the Social-Democrat Group Leader in the European Parliament, Gianni Pittella.

By press release to the Belga agency, Jan Jambon apologized.

References

External links
 

1960 births
Living people
Interior ministers of Belgium
Members of the Chamber of Representatives (Belgium)
New Flemish Alliance politicians
People from Genk
21st-century Belgian politicians